Universeum is a public science centre and museum in Gothenburg, Sweden that opened in 2001. It is a part of Evenemangsstråket, the thoroughfare of events – close to Korsvägen and Skånegatan – which includes sights of interest like Scandinavium, Ullevi, Svenska Mässan (Swedish Exhibition Centre), Liseberg and the Museum of World Culture.

Universeum is divided into six sections, each containing experiment workshops and a collection of reptiles, fish and insects. Universeum occasionally gives Swedish secondary school students a chance to debate with Nobel prize-winners and professors.

Main sections

The sections of Universeum are:
 "Kalejdo" - An exhibit about Crime-investigation, laser, space, and more.
 "Explora" - An experiment department that is mostly about humans and technology. 
 "Vattnets Väg" (Water's Way) - The Swedish fresh and brackish water fishes, reptiles and voles.
 "Akvariehallen" (The Ocean Zone) - Marine animals.
 "Regnskogen" (The Rainforest) - A rainforest hall with tropical animals.
 "Dödliga Skönheter" (Deadly Beauties) - Deadly and venomous reptiles.

The architect behind Universeum is Gert Wingårdh.

See also
 The International Science Festival in Gothenburg

References

External links

Museums in Gothenburg
Gert Wingårdh buildings
Natural history museums in Sweden
Science museums in Sweden
Science centers
2001 establishments in Sweden
Museums established in 2001